Trouble in the Air is a 1948 British comedy film directed by Charles Saunders and starring Freddie Frinton, Jimmy Edwards and Bill Owen. It was made at Highbury Studios as a second feature. The film's sets were designed by the art director Don Russell.

Synopsis
A BBC broadcaster travels to a small village for a feature on a bell ringing team, but becomes entangled in an attempt by a spiv to cheat an impoverished local landowner. Assisted by the loyal butler the landowner is eventually saved by a football pools win, even if the broadcast turns out to be a disaster.

Cast

References

Bibliography
 Chibnall, Steve & McFarlane, Brian. The British 'B' Film. Palgrave MacMillan, 2009.

External links

1948 films
British comedy films
1948 comedy films
Films directed by Charles Saunders
Films set in England
Films shot at Highbury Studios
British black-and-white films
1940s English-language films
1940s British films